Billy Weepu is a New Zealand former rugby league footballer who played for the Manly Sea Eagles in the NRL, and is now a news camera operator.

He is the brother of rugby union player Piri Weepu.

Playing career

Early years
Weepu started his career with the Wainuiomata Lions in the Wellington Rugby League competition.

Manly Sea Eagles
He was then scouted by Manly and joined the club in 1994. He went on to play 13 first grade games for the club in 1995 and 1997 as well as becoming a regular in reserve grade.

He was regarded as one of the heaviest players to play in the Australian competition.

Return to New Zealand
Weepu played for both Wellington and Taranaki in the 1999 National Provincial Competition, becoming the subject of a NZRL appeal. Along with fellow Wellington prop, Tino Brown, Weepu was later ruled ineligible to play for the Taranaki Sharks.

With the start of the Bartercard Cup in 2000 Weepu was part of the Wainuiomata Lions side that participated in the first two seasons.

In 2002, with the demise of the Lions, he moved to the Central Falcons.

Representative career
Weepu was selected for the Junior Kiwis in 1994.

In 2000 Weepu represented New Zealand Māori.

In 2015 Weepu played for the New Zealand Parliamentary rugby team that played in the United Kingdom for Parliamentary World Cup.

Later years
Weepu worked as a Camera operator for TV3's Campbell Live until 2015. He previously worked on 60 Minutes. He remains with Newshub as of 2020.

References

New Zealand rugby league players
New Zealand Māori rugby league players
New Zealand people of Niuean descent
New Zealand Māori rugby league team players
Manly Warringah Sea Eagles players
Manawatu rugby league team players
Wellington rugby league team players
Wainuiomata Lions players
Taranaki rugby league team players
Junior Kiwis players
Living people
Rugby league props
Year of birth missing (living people)